Neversink Valley Grange Hall No. 1530 is a historic Grange meeting hall located Huguenot in Orange County, New York.  It was built in 1934, and is a one-story with raised basement, rectangular wood-frame building with a medium pitched front gable roof.  It has a projecting entry block that includes a vestibule and stairs to the upper and lower levels.  In addition to a Grange hall, the building served as an early community center.

It was listed on the National Register of Historic Places in 2013.

References

Grange buildings on the National Register of Historic Places in New York (state)
Cultural infrastructure completed in 1934
Buildings and structures in Orange County, New York
National Register of Historic Places in Orange County, New York
1934 establishments in New York (state)